Superman Returns is a video game based on the film of the same name. It was developed by EA Tiburon and published by Electronic Arts in conjunction with Warner Bros. Interactive Entertainment and DC Comics.

In the game, Superman combats Bizarro, as well as other classic villains (including Metallo, Mongul, and Riot) as well as being able to play as Bizarro in one of the minigames. It was produced for the Xbox 360 as well as the PlayStation 2, Xbox and Nintendo DS.

The game features the voice and likeness of Brandon Routh (Superman/Clark Kent) as well as the voices of Kevin Spacey (Lex Luthor), Kate Bosworth (Lois Lane), Parker Posey (Kitty Kowalski) and Sam Huntington (Jimmy Olsen), all reprising their roles from the film.

The Nintendo DS version also features games based on the film, but they are fundamentally different from the console title. The games were delayed from their original release date (set to coincide with the theatrical release of the film) due to design complications and issues with polish on the console game. The handheld games were delayed in order to preserve a simultaneous release with non-handheld SKUs. The games were ultimately released on November 22, 2006, in the United States and November 30 in Australia, to coincide with the DVD release of Superman Returns.

Gameplay
The game has an 80 sq. mile free-roaming map, and the character is able to fly into the stratosphere generated in the game though not into the depths of the ocean surrounding the fictional city. Superman's complete array of superpowers are at the player's disposal, and the player is required to 'master' Superman's powers, because Superman might cause harm to the city if his powers are used incorrectly. If the player wishes to use heat vision, they must use the right power level, for too much power can lead to civilian casualties and destruction. Although at the beginning of the game you will start off using the most basic forms of Superman's powers and you will be required to upgrade them in order to achieve greater strength, speed, distance and damage.

As for the flying in-game, the player will be able to fly at different speeds, the maximum being 800 mph, which is faster than the speed of sound. The faster Superman travels, the more the screen will blur. As stated above, each power will have different levels of energy.

In the main game, Superman is invincible: no matter what happens to Superman in the game, he cannot be killed. The one exception is during the second part of the tutorial mission which is three boss fights in a row without a checkpoint on War World, here Superman does take damage to the point of mission failure. But Metropolis isn't as fortunate, there is a damage meter - if too much damage is done to the city during a mission (in other words, if the damage meter is fully depleted) then the game ends. Superman has a stamina meter that depletes as more power is used. Player can fly Superman into the atmosphere and absorb sunlight to replenish the stamina meter faster, as performed by Superman many times in comic books.

In the game, the player is challenged to be creative with Superman's powers. To stop a burning building, for example, Superman could use his freeze breath and risk not being able to save all of the civilian casualties in time, or alternatively, he could pick up a fire truck and station it at a more convenient level (i.e. on top of a building adjacent to the burning one) for a faster extinguishing effect.

Amongst the various unlockables, there are alternate costumes (a 'Pod Suit' and 'Golden Age Suit' are featured in addition to the suit from the film). These costumes will be accessed from the 'Fortress of Solitude' (the menu screen). A 'Bizarro' mode is also featured where the player must destroy as much as they are told to in a limited time. There is also an unlockable 'Bizarro rampage' mode that will allow the player to cause havoc as Bizarro for an unlimited amount of time. This mode is accessible by using a cheat code found on the Superman Returns DVD.

Superman's famed x-ray vision is used automatically when Superman picks-up an object. The object is made transparent to the player so it will not obstruct the player's point of view during gameplay.

Plot
The story begins with Metropolis suffering a devastating meteor shower. Superman uses his full array of powers, including his strength, freeze breath, and heat vision to destroy the deadly rocks before they can strike the city.

Following this incident, astronomers announce that they have discovered the remains of the dead planet Krypton. Superman flies to the distant galaxy in the space rocket that his father sent him to Earth in to investigate the ruins of his homeworld and to see if there is anything left. He finds only gigantic, asteroid-sized chunks of kryptonite, pieces of the planet that were irradiated by the supernova that destroyed the great civilization. Superman turns his ship around and heads back to Earth, but along the way he is intercepted by Mongul and forced to compete in gladiatorial combat in Warworld. Mongul first puts him against an elite team of warriors known as the Plahtune, but the Man of Steel easily beats them. Next, he confronts Overkhast, an alien who can fire energy from his hands and who can also transform into a gigantic energy-based creature that can emit shock waves of power. After Superman overcomes him, Mongul himself steps into the arena to battle Superman. Though he is powerful and possesses great strength, Mongul is still no match for the Last Son of Krypton. At the conclusion of their fight, Superman picks up Mongul and prepares to deliver what would most certainly be a killing strike. Mongul taunts him, "Go on, Superman. You know you want to." Superman then throws Mongul to the floor and states that the fight is over. Superman then finds his ship and sets off for Earth, but Mongul vows that he will find him.

Superman's return to Metropolis is greeted with ecstatic applause by most, but Lois Lane seems somewhat hesitant to put her faith in him again. Soon after his return however, Metallo attacks the city with an army of robots when he hears Superman is back. He fights both the supervillain and his minions. While the lesser opponents are of little consequence to the Kryptonian, Metallo is another matter. After many fights, they have their last battle where Metallo transforms into a towering monstrosity that Superman cannot directly touch because of his kryptonite-powered body. He compensates for this by throwing objects at the villain. Realizing that he is about to be defeated, Metallo fires a large missile to destroy Metropolis, but Superman intercepts the projectile and hurls it into the sky. Superman shows Metallo no mercy, gathering all of his strength and charging the villain, tearing through his body and ripping out his power source.

Unknown to Superman during his absence, Lex Luthor broke into the Fortress of Solitude and stole his data crystals. Lex Luthor experiments with the crystals by adding a small particle to water, also causing an electromagnetic pulse that releases numerous villains and genetic creatures including Bizarro. Bizarro begins a rampage throughout Metropolis, destroying buildings and attacking citizens. Though Bizarro is of equal might, Superman is a much more experienced fighter. In the end, Superman defeats Bizarro, but does not kill him because he knows that the poor creature is incapable of understanding his actions.

Then Superman faces off against Riot and his clones in the Hyper Sector of Metropolis. Superman defeats Riot with a combination of his fists and freeze breath. No sooner has he defeated Riot then an old enemy returns for a rematch. Mongul and his minions have followed Superman to Earth. Superman battles Plahtune and Overkhast, and confronts Mongul after once again. The fight is fierce, but as before the Man of Steel emerges victorious. Mongul admits that he is defeated and flees Earth.

There is no time to celebrate this victory, because Lex Luthor has put his diabolical scheme of creating a new continent over America with the Kryptonian crystals into effect. Luthor plants the main crystal and an entire new landmass begins to form off the coast of Metropolis, which causes several tornadoes to form and tear through the city. Superman deflects the tornadoes and extinguishes the fires that have erupted throughout the city, then flies out over the water to investigate. He finds Lex Luthor's boat sinking, the evil mastermind having abandoned it after planting the crystal. Lois had sneaked onto the ship and is trapped as it is sinking, and Superman rescues her and takes her unconscious form to the coast guard. He then discovers the gigantic new island forming as a result of the crystal. Superman lands on the island and discovers too late that he has fallen into a trap. The island is laced with kryptonite. Lex Luthor beats on and tortures the Man of Steel, then kicks the powerless Superman into the ocean far below. But Lois arrives with the coast guard and rescues Superman, who flies into outer space to bask in the rays of the sun before burrowing his way under the ocean floor and lifting the landmass directly out of the water and throwing it into space.

Superman flies back to Metropolis to take care of the few remaining villains who earlier escaped him, ending the game.

Reception

Superman Returns: The Videogame was received poorly. GameRankings gave it a score of 31.92% for the DS version, 45.70% for the PS2 version, 54.18% for the Xbox version, and 53.25% for the Xbox 360 version; while Metacritic gave it a score of 33 out of 100 for the DS version, 46 out of 100 for the PS2 version, and 51 out of 100 for both the Xbox and Xbox 360 versions. IGN criticized the game's lack of a concluding villain saying that "The final boss in Superman Returns: The Videogame is a tornado. Not Lex Luthor. Not General Zod; not that Nuclear Man -- not even Richard Pryor.  A tornado!" Official PlayStation 2 Magazine UK gave the game a 5/10, saying "They've got the man bit down but in no way is this super."  Official Xbox Magazine gave the Xbox version of this game the award of "Best Graphics... if They Were on [the original PlayStation]" in the 2006 Game of The Year Awards. X-Play gave the Xbox 360 version a 1/5 for poor control, boring and bland enemies, and for featuring a tornado as the final boss. The A.V. Club gave it a D and stated that "A making-of documentary on how such a precious franchise was so flagrantly mishandled would be far more entertaining than anything the game has to offer."

References

External links

 Official homepage
 
 Superman Returns on the EA website
 

2006 video games
Nintendo DS games
PlayStation 2 games
Superman video games
Xbox 360 games
Xbox games
Video games based on films
Video games based on adaptations
Video games based on works by Michael Dougherty
Open-world video games
Superhero video games
Action video games
Single-player video games
Video games using Havok
Electronic Arts games
Superman (1978 film series)
Video games set in the United States
Video games based on works by Dan Harris (screenwriter)
Video games scored by Colin O'Malley
Video games developed in the United States